P. J. Abbott (born May 28, 1964) is an American racing driver. In 2004, he drove in two races in the Infiniti Pro Series for Michael Crawford Motorsports. Prior to that, he competed in US SCCA Formula Mazda and SCCA Formula Atlantic. He also raced in the NASCAR West Series four times in 2004 and 2005. His best finish in the series was 13th place at Stockton 99 Speedway.

Motorsports career results

NASCAR 
(key) (Bold – Pole position awarded by qualifying time. Italics – Pole position earned by points standings or practice time. * – Most laps led.)

AutoZone West Series

American open–wheel racing results 
(key) (Races in bold indicate pole position)

Indy Lights

References

External links 
 

Living people
1964 births
Sportspeople from Bloomington, Indiana
Racing drivers from Indiana
Indy Lights drivers
NASCAR drivers

Arrow McLaren SP drivers